Mandas is a comune (municipality) in the Province of South Sardinia in the Italian region Sardinia, located about  north of Cagliari.

Mandas borders the following municipalities: Escolca, Gergei, Gesico, Nurri, Serri, Siurgus Donigala, Suelli.

In January 1921, D. H. Lawrence and his wife Frieda (the Queen-Bee) visited the city on their way to Sorgono. An account of their visit can be read in one of Lawrence's travel books, Sea and Sardinia (1921).

Demographic evolution

References

External links 

 web.tiscali.it/mandasnet

Cities and towns in Sardinia